Zurkhaneh at the 2017 Islamic Solidarity Games was held in Crystal Hall, Baku, Azerbaijan from 20 May to 21 May 2017.

Medalists

Medal table

References

External links
Official website

2017 Islamic Solidarity Games
2017